Indian Merchants' Chamber, established on 7 September 1907 in Mumbai, is an organization of India, representing interests of Indian trade, commerce, and industry. It was organized originally during the days of the British Raj to promote trade, commerce, and industry by Indian entrepreneurs.

IMC has played a significant role in consolidating Indian business interests and making the Indian economy self-reliant. It kept pace with and, in its own way, became part of the Indian struggle for freedom. It was the Chamber's dedication that made Mahatma Gandhi patronise it and accept, in 1931, its honorary membership — a rare honour bestowed upon any chamber of commerce in the country.

Today, its institutional records are part of the Archives at the Nehru Memorial Museum & Library, at Teen Murti House, Delhi.

On 7 September 2006, India Post issued a commemorative postage stamp to mark its centenary.

See also
 Confederation of Indian Industry
 FICCI

References

External links
Official website

Trade associations based in India
Companies based in Mumbai
Chambers of commerce in India
1907 establishments in India
Organizations established in 1907